Mouret may refer to:

Mouret, Aveyron, a town in France
Le Mouret, a municipality in the canton of Fribourg, Switzerland
Lissac-et-Mouret, a commune in the Lot department, France

People with the surname
Cédric Mouret (born 1978), French footballer
Hélène Conway-Mouret (born 1960), French politician
Jacques François Mouret (born 1787), French chess player
Jean-Joseph Mouret (1682-1738), French composer best known for his Fanfare-Rondeau used as the theme for the television series
Roland Mouret (born 1962), French fashion designer

See also
Masterpiece (formerly Masterpiece Theatre)
Moure (disambiguation)

French-language surnames